Dr. Ivo Stern (24 December 1889 – 1961) was Croatian lawyer, writer, journalist, director and founder of the "Zagreb Radiostation" (now Croatian Radiotelevision).

Stern was born to a wealthy Jewish family on 24 December 1889 in Zagreb. He studied and graduated at the Faculty of Law at the University of Zagreb in 1913. After graduation, he practiced the law for a while. After World War I, in which he participated as a soldier in the Austro-Hungarian Army, Stern lived in Vienna. In 1926 as the head of the Zagreb group of bankers and industrials, despite the opposition from Belgrade, Stern founded the "Zagreb Radiostation". Stern was first director and major shareholder of the "Zagreb Radiostation". He was also the program editor until 1938. Stern was close friend of Croatian writer Milan Begović.

Distinctly higher in education, polyglot, charming and elegant, financially independent, Stern fraternize with many Croatian writers. His apartment in Jurišićeva street was a place of elegant banquets. He was a member of the Croatian Freemasonry and founder of the elite "Rotary Club" which had predominantly Masonic membership.

Stern wrote left pacifist oriented emphatic expressive poetry, which was published in the magazine "Plamen". He also wrote political feuilletons. One of his feuilletons was devoted to the problem of the Jewish diaspora in the new post-war Europe, for which he was criticized and accused that he represents the Jewish messianism of Bolsheviks, Leon Trotsky and Béla Kun.

In the eve of World War II, Stern changed his surname to Globnik and moved to Italy where he died in 1961.

References

Bibliography

 

1889 births
1960 deaths
Lawyers from Zagreb
Croatian Jews
Austro-Hungarian Jews
Croatian Austro-Hungarians
Jewish Austrian writers
Journalists from Zagreb
Faculty of Law, University of Zagreb alumni
Businesspeople from Zagreb
Yugoslav lawyers
20th-century journalists
Yugoslav businesspeople